Phyllocycla is a genus of clubtails in the family Gomphidae, commonly known as the lesser forceptails. There are at least 30 described species in Phyllocycla.

See also
 List of Phyllocycla species

References

Gomphidae
Odonata genera